Thomas de Ashton may refer to:

Thomas de Ashton (warrior) (fl. 1346), English warrior
Thomas de Ashton (alchemist) (born 1403), English alchemist

See also
Thomas Ashton (disambiguation)